Mike Sansing is a former American college baseball coach, who a majority of his career served as head coach of the Kennesaw State Owls baseball team. He was named to that position prior to the 1992 season, when Kennesaw State was an NAIA team.  He led the Owls as they joined the NCAA's Division II in 1994, and in 2005 began the process to elevate the program to Division I, completed for the 2010 season.

Sansing played at Gordon College and West Georgia, being named all-conference all four years, and team MVP honors three times.  He began his coaching career with the Wolves in 1985.  He served two seasons as an assistant, then two seasons at Southern Poly before his first head coaching position at Shorter.  In his final year with the Hawks, he led the team to the 1991 conference title; he was named the conference coach of the year in both 1990 and 1991.  He then moved to Kennesaw State.  In his time with the Owls, he led Kennesaw State to the 1994 NAIA World Series title in their final season in the NAIA.  The Owls then claimed the 1996 NCAA Division II Baseball Championship and a pair of national runner-up finishes in 1998 and 1999.  Nine of his teams have won 40 or more games, including six in a row and 61 in 1998, a national record.  Baseball America named Kennesaw State the "Best Division II program of the 1990s."

After moving to Division I, the Owls joined the Atlantic Sun Conference. They were not eligible for the postseason until 2010, but then made four straight A-Sun Tournaments from 2011–2014. They went 0–2 in 2011, lost in the championship game in 2012 and 2013, and won the 2014 tournament to advance to their first NCAA Division I Baseball Championship.  There, they had surprising success, going 3–1 at the Tallahassee Regional to advance to the Super Regional round, where they lost to Louisville.

On May 31, 2021, Keenesaw State announced Mike Sansing's retirement.

Head coaching record
Below is a table of Sansing's records as a collegiate head baseball coach.

References

Living people
Gordon Highlanders baseball players
Kennesaw State Owls baseball coaches
Shorter Hawks baseball coaches
Southern Poly Runnin' Hornets baseball coaches
West Georgia Wolves baseball coaches
West Georgia Wolves baseball players
Baseball coaches from Georgia (U.S. state)
Year of birth missing (living people)